"Duele el Corazón" (English: "The Heart Hurts") is a song by Spanish singer Enrique Iglesias featuring vocals from Puerto Rican rapper Wisin. It was released on 18 April 2016 under his new record company Sony Music Latin. The song was produced by Carlos Paucar, co-produced by Juan Carlos Yepez Jr  (JY "El De La J") Francisco Saldaña (Luny). The Peruvian composer Patrick Ingunza wrote the song along with Venezuelan singer Servando Primera and the Ecuadorian American record producer and songwriter Juan Carlos Yepez Jr  (JY "El De La J").

Background 
In an interview with Miami's Romance 107.5 Monday, Enrique said of this song, "This song was born from an idea of one of my friends, I then worked in the studio and developed it in the studio for about eight months... which is not that much time." Adding that, "What I look for in a song is something that animates people, something that I like, If I don't like the song, I don't want to release it, because then I have to promote it and talk about it millions of times."

Chart performance
"Duele el Corazón" debuted at number one on the Latin Pop Songs chart and number two on the Hot Latin Songs chart, where it climbed at number one in its second week and number one on the Latin Airplay chart.

The single in Europe reached the top 10 in countries such as Belgium, Bulgaria, France, Hungary, Italy, Netherlands, Poland, and Slovakia, peaking at number one in Spain, Portugal, Mexico, Slovenia and Switzerland. It was also a top 40 hit in Austria, the Czech Republic, and Germany.

"Duele el Corazón" became Enrique's 27th number one hit on Billboards Hot Latin Songs chart – more the any other artist. Plus, he holds the record for "most number one debuts on Billboards Latin Airplay chart," marking his fourth number one entry. The song debuted at number one on the Latin Airplay chart and earned the "highest single week audience for a song since 2008 with 18.6 million listeners," according to Billboard.

"Duele el Corazón" has sold over two million track equivalent sales worldwide, it reached number one in 25 digital stores around the world, and was the 61st most streamed track on Spotify with over 229 million streams.

Music video 
The release of the song was accompanied with an official lyric video which was uploaded to Enrique's account on YouTube, which got 50 million views in three weeks. On the same day, Enrique posted a short clip of himself shooting the official music video of the song. The official video was filmed in Panama. The video was produced by London-based production company Artist Preserve with executive producers and Enrique's long time creative collaborators Yasha Malekzad and Kasra Pezeshki. Cuban director Alejandro Pérez directed the video. The video features Swedish born model Kelly Gale. It was released on YouTube on 13 May 2016.

The lyrics fit well to form a storyline combined with the depicted scenes in the music video. It is about an old love of Enrique's character with a woman with whom he had a happy relationship. But since the woman has left him for her current, abusive husband it went downhill for her. In the video, Enrique's character comes together with her but the powerful, rich abusive husband manipulates this by shooting at and kidnapping Enrique in order to prevent his wife from leaving him for Enrique as the meeting was intended for. However, as he takes Enrique, the woman arrives just on time to witness the ordeal and her wounded love, strongly disapproving the abusive husband's actions. He orders Enrique out of the helicopter and lets him go, as the master plan failed (he ultimately wanted to prevent the meeting to keep the girl for himself instead, but ends up with her witnessing the kidnapping and his crime). It is visible that the abusive husband hesitates to let him go, but the viewers see a happy end as Enrique is released to the girl to reunite. However, the video ends with a scene of Enrique leaving on his own without his true love and the helicopter passing over, implying she still went off with them, therefore sketching the scenario that the girl arriving to the ordeal only saved him from malicious intent or worse faith that would result from the kidnapping, as it was interrupted in progress, and additionally gave them room for meeting each other instead of coming back together.

Reception and accolades
"Duele el Corazón" was nominated for Record of the Year and Song of the Year at the 17th Annual Latin Grammy Awards. It was also nominated for Single of the Year, Pop Song of the Year, and won for Collaboration of the Year at the 29th Lo Nuestro Awards.

Formats and track listings

Charts

Weekly charts

Year-end charts

Decade-end charts

Certifications

See also
List of Airplay 100 number ones of the 2010s
List of number-one songs of 2016 (Mexico)
List of number-one dance singles of 2016 (U.S.)
List of number-one Billboard Hot Latin Songs of 2016

Personnel
Associated Performer: Enrique Iglesias feat. Wisin

Composer, Lyricist: Juan Luis Moreira

Percussion: Richard Bravo

Composer, Lyricist: Francisco Saldana
 
Bass: Richard Marcel

Composer, Lyricist: Hasibur Rahman

Other, Composer, Lyricist: Patrick A. Ingunza
 
Background Vocal, Guitar, Engineer, Mixing Engineer, Producer: Carlos Paucar
 
Composer, Lyricist: Servando Moriche Primera Mussett

Background Vocal: Willy Perez Feria
 
Background Vocal: Fabián Alicastro

Composer, Lyricist: Silverlo Lozada
 
Background Vocal: Michael Cosculluela
 
Background Vocal: Eddie Roses
 
Background Vocal: Elias Ponce
 
Co- Producer: Luny Tunes

Mastering Engineer: Tom Coyne

Mastering Engineer: Aya Merrill
 
Recording Engineer: Jose Hyde Cotto

Recording Engineer: Daniel Abrusci

References

2016 singles
2016 songs
Enrique Iglesias songs
Monitor Latino Top General number-one singles
Number-one singles in Israel
Number-one singles in Romania
Songs written by Enrique Iglesias
Sony Music Latin singles
Spanish-language songs
Wisin songs
Number-one singles in Spain